Pyrausta ignealis is a moth in the family Crambidae. It was described by George Hampson in 1899. It is found on New Guinea (Fergusson Island) and Australia, where it has been recorded from Queensland.

References

Moths described in 1899
ignealis
Moths of New Guinea
Moths of Australia